Zilayi Rural District is a rural district (dehestan) in Margown District, Boyer-Ahmad County, Kohgiluyeh and Boyer-Ahmad Province, Iran. At the 2006 census, its population was 11,041, including 2,163 families (5.1 people per family). The rural district has 64 villages.

References 

Rural Districts of Kohgiluyeh and Boyer-Ahmad Province
Boyer-Ahmad County